Supersub may mean:

 supersub, a cricket term for a type of substitute player/player substitution.
 super-submarine sandwich, a larger, longer or more stuffed hero sandwich.
 a super-submarine, a superior underwater vehicle.
 Japanese supersub, the World War II-era I-400 class submarine
 Narco supersub, the true-submarines (as opposed to semi-subs) for narcotics smuggling, see narco submarine
Supersub, a nickname of David Fairclough (born 1957), English footballer